Roy Emerson defeated Rod Laver 7–5, 6–3, 6–2 in the final to win the men's singles tennis title at the 1961 U.S. National Championships.

Seeds
The seeded players are listed below. Roy Emerson is the champion; others show the round in which they were eliminated.

 Rod Laver (finalist)
 Chuck McKinley (third round)
 Roy Emerson (champion)
 Mike Sangster (semifinals)
 Bob Mark (fourth round)
 Frank Froehling (third round)
 Jon Douglas (quarterfinals)
 Ron Holmberg (quarterfinals)

Draw

Key
 Q = Qualifier
 WC = Wild card
 LL = Lucky loser
 r = Retired

Final eight

Earlier rounds

Section 1

Section 2

Section 3

Section 4

Section 5

Section 6

Section 7

Section 8

References

External links
 1961 U.S. National Championships on ITFtennis.com, the source for this draw
 Association of Tennis Professionals (ATP) – 1961 U.S. Championships Men's Singles draw

U.S. National Championships (tennis) by year – Men's singles
Mens Singles